Pettingen is a village in the commune of Mersch, in central Luxembourg. In 2005, the village had a population of 198.

Pettingen Castle in the center of the village is one of the best-preserved fortified castles in the country.

See also
 List of villages in Luxembourg

References

Mersch
Villages in Luxembourg